Anton Christian Bang (18 September 1840 in Dønna, Helgeland – 29 December 1913) was a Norwegian theologian, historian and politician for the Conservative Party of Norway.
Bang was one of the more prominent figures within the Church of Norway in the decades around 1900. He served as a professor of church history at the Royal Frederick University from 1885 onward, as Minister of Education and Church Affairs from 1893 to 1895, and as Bishop of Oslo from 1896 to 1912.

Biography
Bang was born on the island of Dønna in Nordland to Ivar Christian Bang Andersen and Mariane Hansdatter Klæboe. As a youth he was involved in the Lofoten fishing season. He attended a teachers' school in Tromsø (1858–1960) and theology studies (1862–1867), and then served in ministries in Gran, in Tromsø, and at Gaustad asylum in Christiania. In 1876 he received the first doctorate in theology at the University of Oslo on the subject  (The Historical Reality of Christ's Resurrection).

Bang was a professor of church history (1885) and Bishop of Oslo (1896–1912). As the Bishop of Oslo and with his close ties to the royal house, he represented several national missions, including at the inauguration of the German Redemption Church in Jerusalem in 1898.

Bang was Minister of Education and Church Affairs from 1893 to 1895, and a member of the Council of State Division in Stockholm in 1895.  Bang was appointed to the Second cabinet of Emil Stang in 1893.

As a researcher Bang was very productive and his writings cover a wide field.  Bang wrote several major works in his career, including a notable biography on Hans Nielsen Hauge. The main contribution he made was as a collector of historical information, and he thus made an important contribution to religious folklore research. He was considered a conservative, both as a politician and as a theologian.

Honors
 Commander of the 1st Class of the Order of St. Olav (1895)
 King Oscar II of Sweden award (1895)

Selected works
 (1868)
 (1874)
 (1879)
 (1879) Overview of the Historic Argument 
 (1881)
 (1883)
 (1887)
 (1890)
 (1895)
 (1897)
 (1901–02)
 (1909)
 (1912)

References

Other sources
J. Brochmann:  (1898)
G. Grundt:  (1958)
A. M. Smørvik:  (1987)
Bang, Bugge, and Rydberg: Völuspá and the Sibylline Oracles

External links
 

1840 births
1913 deaths
People from Dønna
Conservative Party (Norway) politicians
Government ministers of Norway
19th-century Norwegian historians
Norwegian theologians
19th-century Protestant theologians
Bishops of Oslo
Ministers of Education of Norway